Urartian or Vannic is an extinct Hurro-Urartian language which was spoken by the inhabitants of the ancient kingdom of Urartu (Biaini or Biainili in Urartian), which was centered on the region around Lake Van and had its capital, Tushpa, near the site of the modern town of Van in the Armenian highlands (now in the Eastern Anatolia region of Turkey). Its past prevalence is unknown. While some believe it was probably dominant around Lake Van and in the areas along the upper Zab valley, others believe it was spoken by a relatively small population who comprised a ruling class.

First attested in the 9th century BCE, Urartian ceased to be written after the fall of the Urartian state in 585 BCE and presumably became extinct due to the fall of Urartu. It must have had long contact with, and been gradually totally replaced by, an early form of Armenian, although it is only in the 5th century CE that the first written examples of Armenian appear.

Classification

Urartian is an ergative, agglutinative language, which belongs to the Hurro-Urartian family, whose only other known member is Hurrian. It survives in many cuneiform inscriptions found in the territory of the Kingdom of Urartu. There have been claims of a separate autochthonous script of "Urartian hieroglyphs" but they remain unsubstantiated.

Urartian is closely related to Hurrian, a somewhat better documented language attested for an earlier, non-overlapping period, approximately from 2000 BCE to 1200 BCE (written by native speakers until about 1350 BCE). The two languages must have developed quite independently from approximately 2000 BCE onwards. Although Urartian is not a direct continuation of any of the attested dialects of Hurrian, many of its features are best explained as innovative developments with respect to Hurrian as it is known from the preceding millennium. The closeness holds especially true of the so-called Old Hurrian dialect, known above all from Hurro-Hittite bilingual texts.

The external connections of the Hurro-Urartian languages are disputed. There exist various proposals for a genetic relationship to other language families (e.g. Northeast Caucasian languages, Indo European languages, or Kartvelian languages), but none of these are generally accepted.

Indo-European (namely Armenian and Anatolian, as well as Iranian and possibly Paleo-Balkan) etymologies have been proposed for many Urartian personal and topographic names, such as the names of kings Arame and Argishti, regions such as Diauehi and Uelikulqi, cities such as Arzashkun, geographical features like the Arșania River, as well as some Urartian vocabulary and grammar. Surviving texts of the language are written in a variant of the cuneiform script called Neo-Assyrian.

Decipherment
The German scholar Friedrich Eduard Schulz, who discovered the Urartian inscriptions of the Lake Van region in 1826, made copies of several cuneiform inscriptions at Tushpa, but made no attempt at decipherment. Schulz's drawings, published posthumously only in 1840 in the Journal Asiatique, were crucial in forwarding the decipherment of Mesopotamian cuneiform by Edward Hincks.

After the decipherment of Assyrian cuneiform in the 1850s, Schulz's drawings became the basis of the decipherment of the Urartian language. It soon became clear that it was unrelated to any known language, and attempts at decipherment based on known languages of the region failed. The script was finally deciphered in 1882 by A. H. Sayce. The oldest of these inscriptions is from the time of Sarduri I of Urartu.

Decipherment only made progress after World War I, with the discovery of Urartian-Assyrian bilingual inscriptions at Kelišin and Topzawä.

In 1963, a grammar of Urartian was published by G. A. Melikishvili in Russian, appearing in German translation in 1971. In the 1970s, the genetic relation with Hurrian was established by  I. M. Diakonoff.

Corpus 

The oldest recorded texts originate from the reign of Sarduri I, from the late 9th century BCE. Texts were produced until the fall of the realm of Urartu approximately 200 years later.

Approximately two hundred inscriptions written in the Urartian language, which adopted and modified the cuneiform script, have been discovered to date.

Writing

Cuneiform 
Urartian cuneiform is a standardized simplification of Neo-Assyrian cuneiform.
Unlike in Assyrian, each sign only expresses a single sound value.
The sign  gi  has the special function of expressing a hiatus, e.g. u-gi-iš-ti for Uīšdi. A variant script with non-overlapping wedges was in use for rock inscriptions.

Hieroglyphs
Urartian was also rarely written in the "Anatolian hieroglyphs" used for the Luwian language. Evidence for this is restricted to Altıntepe.

There are suggestions that besides the Luwian hieroglyphic inscriptions, Urartu also had a native hieroglyphic script.
The inscription corpus is too sparse to substantiate the hypothesis. It remains unclear whether the symbols in question form a coherent writing system, or represent just a multiplicity of uncoordinated expressions of proto-writing or ad-hoc drawings.
This is known because some vessels were labelled both in cuneiform and with these symbols.

Phonology

Urartian had at least the following consonants, conventionally transcribed below:

There were presumably also the semivowels /w/ and /j/.

As usual with ancient languages, the exact nature and pronunciation of the consonants are uncertain. As the table shows, the stops and the sibilants all display a three-way distinction between voiced, voiceless and "emphatic" consonants, but it cannot be ascertained what was special about the third groups of consonants, which were rendered with the Akkadian cuneiform signs for the Semitic emphatics. Perhaps they were glottalized or aspirated. The pronunciation of the sibilants is debatable, as it is for Akkadian; some may actually have been affricates.

The script distinguishes the vowels a, e, i and u. It is unclear whether there was an /o/ as well. There may have been phonemic vowel length, but it is not consistently expressed in the script. Word-finally, the distinction between e and i is not maintained, so many scholars transcribe the graphically vacillating vowel as a schwa: ə, while some preserve a non-reduced vowel (usually opting for i). The full form of the vowel appears when suffixes are added to the word and the vowel is no longer in the last syllable: Argištə "Argišti" - Argištešə "by Argišti (ergative case)". This vowel reduction also suggests that stress was commonly on the next-to-the-last syllable.

In the morphonology, various morpheme combinations trigger syncope: *ar-it-u-mə → artumə, *zaditumə → zatumə, *ebani-ne-lə → ebanelə, *turul(e)yə → tul(e)yə.

Morphology

Nominal morphology

Nouns 
The morphemes which may occur in a noun follow a strict order:

Stem 
All nouns appear to end in a so-called thematic vowel - most frequently -i or -e, but -a and -u also occur. They may also end in a derivational suffix. Notable derivational suffixes are -ḫə, forming adjectives of belonging (e.g. Abiliane-ḫə "of the tribe Abiliani", Argište-ḫə "son of Argišti") and -šə, forming abstract nouns (e.g. alsui-šə "greatness", ardi-šə "order", arniu-šə "deed").

Article 
The forms of the so-called "article" are -nə (non-reduced form -ne-) for the singular, -ne-lə for the plural in the absolutive case and -na- for the other forms of the plural. They are referred to as "anaphoric suffixes" and can be compared to definite articles, although their use does not always seem to match that description exactly. They also obligatorily precede agreement suffixes added through Suffixaufnahme: e.g. Argište-šə Menua-ḫi-ne-šə "Argišti (ergative), son of Menua (ergative)". The plural form can also serve as a general plural marker in non-absolutive cases: arniuši-na-nə "by the deeds".

Possessive suffixes 
The well-attested possessive suffixes are the ones of the first person singular -ukə (in non-reduced form sometimes -uka-) and of the 3rd person singular -i(yə)- (in non-reduced form sometimes -iya-): e.g.  ebani-uka-nə "from my country", ebani-yə "his country".

Number and case suffixes 
The plural is expressed, above all, through the use of the plural "article" (-ne-lə in the absolutive case, -na- preceding the case suffix in the oblique cases), but some of the case suffixes also differ in form between the singular and the plural. Therefore, separate plural version of the case suffixes are indicated below separately. The nature of the absolutive and ergative cases is as in other ergative languages (more details in the section Syntax below).

Since the "complete" plural forms also include the plural definite article, they appear as -ne-lə, -na-šə, -na-wə, na-(e)də or na-š-tə, etc.

Suffixaufnahme 
A phenomenon typical of Urartian is Suffixaufnahme - a process in which dependent modifiers of a noun (including genitive case modifiers) agree with the head noun by absorbing its case suffixes. The copied suffixes must be preceded by the article (also agreeing in number with the head). Examples: Ḫaldi-i-na-wə šešti-na-wə "for the gates (dative) of [god] Ḫaldi (dative)", Argište-šə Menua-ḫi-ne-šə "Argišti (ergative), son of Menua (ergative)".

Pronouns 
The known personal pronouns are those of the first and third person singular.

The first person singular has two different forms for the absolutive case: ištidə as the absolutive subject of an intransitive verb, and šukə as the absolutive object of a transitive verb. The ergative form is iešə. Judging from correspondences with Hurrian, šu- should be the base for the "regular" case forms. An enclitic dative case suffix for the first person singular is attested as -mə.
The third person singular has the absolutive form manə.
As for possessive pronouns, besides the possessive suffixes (1st singular -uka- and 3rd singular -iya-) that were adduced above, Urartian also makes use of possessive adjectives formed with the suffix -(u)sə: 1st singular šusə, 3rd singular masə.

The encoding of pronominal ergative and absolutive participants in a verb action within the verb is treated in the section on Verbal morphology below.

Demonstrative pronouns are i-nə (plural base i-, followed by article and case forms) and ina-nə (plural base ina-, followed by article and case forms). A relative pronoun is alə.

Verbal morphology

The paradigm of the verb is only partially known. As with the noun, the morphemes that a verb may contain come in a certain sequence that can be formalized as the following "verb chain": 

The meaning of the root complements is unclear. The valency markers express whether the verb is intransitive or transitive. The modal suffix appears in several marked moods (but not in the indicative). The other person suffixes express mostly the absolutive subject or object. It is not clear if and how tense or aspect were signalled.

Valency markers 
The valency markers are -a- (rarely -i-) for intransitivity and -u- for transitivity: for example nun-a-də "I came" vs šidišt-u-nə "he built". A verb that is usually transitive can be converted to intransitivity with the suffix -ul- before the intransitive valency marker: aš-ul-a-bə "was occupied" (vs aš-u-bə "I put in [a garrison]").

Person suffixes 
The person suffixes express the persons of the absolutive subject/object and the ergative subject.  When both subject and object are present, a single transitive suffix may expresses a unique combination of persons (e.g. the combination of ergative 3rd singular and absolutive 3rd singular is marked with the suffix -nə). The following chart lists the currently ascertained endings, along with gaps for those not yet ascertained (the ellipsis marks the place of the valency vowel):

Examples: ušt-a-də "I marched forth"; nun-a-bə "he came"; aš-u-bə "I put-it in"; šidišt-u-nə "he built-it"; ar-u-mə "he gave [it] to me", kuy-it-u-nə "they dedicated-it".

As the paradigm shows, the person suffixes added after the valency vowel express mostly the person of absolutive subject/object, both in intransitive and in transitive verbs. However, the picture is complicated by the fact that the absolutive third person singular is expressed by a different suffix depending on whether the ergative subject is in the first or third person. An additional detail is that when the first-person singular dative suffix -mə is added, the third-person singular absolutive suffix -nə is dropped. The encoding of the person of the absolutive subject/object is present, even though it is also explicitly mentioned in the sentence: e.g. argište-šə inə arə šu-nə "Argišti established(-it) this granary". An exceptional verb is man- "to be", in that it has a transitive valency vowel, and takes no absolutive suffix for the third person singular: man-u "it was" vs man-u-lə "they were".

Mood marking 
The imperative is formed by the addition of the suffix -ə to the root: e.g. ar-ə "give!". 

The jussive or third person imperative is formed by the addition of the suffix -in- in the slot of the valency vowel, whereas the persons are marked in the usual way, following an epenthetic vowel -[i]-:e.g. ar-in-[i]-nə "may he give it", ḫa-it-in-nə "may they take it". 

The modal suffix -l-, added between the valency vowel and the person suffixes, participates in the construction of several modal forms:

1. An optative form, also regularly used in clauses introduced with ašə "when", is constructed by -l- followed by -ə (-i in non-reduced form) - the following absolutive person suffix is optional, and the ergative subject is apparently not signalled at all: e.g. qapqar-u-l-i-nə "I wanted to besiege-it [the city]", urp-u-l-i-nə or urp-u-l-ə "he shall slaughter". 

2. A conditional is expressed by a graphically similar form, which is, however, interpreted by Wilhelm (2008) as -l- followed by -(e)yə: an example of its use is alu-šə tu-l-(e)yə "whoever destroys it". 

3. Finally, a desiderative, which may express the wish of either the speaker or the agent, is expressed by -l- followed by a suffix -anə; in addition, the valency marker is replaced by -i-: e.g. ard-i-l-anə "I want him to give …", ḫa-i-l-anə "it wants to take/conquer …".

Negation is expressed by the particle ui, preceding the verb. A prohibitative particle, also preceding the verb, is mi. mi is also the conjunction "but", whereas e'ə is "and (also)", and unə is "or".

Non-finite forms 
Participles from intransitive verbs are formed with the suffix -urə, added to the root, and have an active meaning (e.g. ušt-u-rə "who has marched forth"). Participles from transitive verbs are formed with the suffix -aurə, and have a passive meaning (e.g. šidaurə "which is built"). It is possible that -umə is the ending of an infinitive or a verb noun, although that is not entirely clear.

Syntax

Urartian is an ergative language, meaning that the subject of an intransitive verb and the object of a transitive verb are expressed identically, with the so-called absolutive case, whereas  the subject of a transitive verb is expressed with a special ergative case. Examples are: Argištə nun-a-bi "Argišti came" vs Argište-šə arə šu-nə "Argišti established a granary". Within the limited number of known forms, no exceptions from the ergative pattern are known.

The word order is usually verb-final, and, more specifically, SOV (where S refers to the ergative agent), but the rule is not rigid and components are occasionally re-arranged for expressive purposes. For example, names of gods are often placed first, even though they are in oblique cases: Ḫaldi-ə ewri-ə inə E2 Argište-šə Menuaḫini-šə šidišt-u-nə "For Ḫaldi the lord Argišti, son of Menua, built this temple." Verbs can be placed sentence-initially in vivid narratives: ušt-a-də Mana-idə ebanə at-u-bə "Forth I marched towards Mana, and I consumed the land." Nominal modifiers usually follow their heads (erelə tarayə "great king"), but deictic pronouns such as inə precede them, and genitives may either precede or follow them. Urartian generally uses postpositions (e.g. ed(i)-i-nə "for", ed(i)-i-a - both originally case forms of edi "person, body" - pei "under", etc..) which govern certain cases (often ablative-instrumental). There is only one attested preposition, parə "to(wards)". Subordinate clauses are introduced by particles such as iu "when", ašə "when", alə "that which".

Language sample
The sample below is from inscription 372 by Menua, son of Ishpuini, based on G. A. Melikishvili's corpus of Urartian Cuneiform Inscriptions.

For each sentence, the transliteration is given first, the morphological transcription second, the translation third.

…

Shared lexicon with Armenian

Diakonoff (1985) and Greppin (1991) present etymologies of several Old Armenian words as having a possible Hurro-Urartian origin. Contemporary linguists, such as Hrach Martirosyan, have rejected many of the Hurro-Urartian origins for these words and instead suggest native Armenian etymologies, leaving the possibility that these words may have been loaned into Hurro-Urartian from Armenian, and not vice versa.

agarak "field" from Hurrian awari "field" (however, alternate theories suggest that this is an Armenian word from Proto-Indo-European h₂éǵros or a Sumerian loan);
ałaxin "slave girl" from Hurrian al(l)a(e)ḫḫenne;
arciw "eagle" from Urartian Arṣiba, a proper name with a presumed meaning of "eagle" (more recent scholarship suggests that this is an Armenian word from Proto-Indo-European *h₂r̥ǵipyós which was loaned into Urartian);
art "field" from Hurrian arde "town" (rejected by Diakonoff and Fournet);
astem "to reveal one's ancestry" from Hurrian ašti "woman, wife";
caṙ "tree" from Urartian ṣârə "garden" (an alternate etymology suggests that this is an Armenian word from  Proto-Indo-European *ǵr̥so);
cov (cf. Armenian Covinar) "sea" from Urartian ṣûǝ "(inland) sea" (an alternate theory suggests that this comes from a Proto-Indo-European root);
kut "grain" from Hurrian kade "barley" (rejected by Diakonoff; closer to Greek kodomeýs "barley-roaster");
maxr ~ marx "pine" from Hurrian māḫri "fir, juniper";
pełem "dig, excavate" from Urartian pile "canal", Hurrian pilli (rejected by Diakonoff, others have suggested an origin stemming from Proto-Indo-European *bel- (“to dig, cut off?”);
salor ~ šlor "plum" from Hurrian *s̄all-orə or Urartian *šaluri (cf. Akkadian šallūru "plum");
san "kettle" from Urartian sane "kettle, pot";
sur "sword", from Urartian šure "sword", Hurrian šawri "weapon, spear" (considered doubtful by Diakonoff, contemporary linguists believe this is an Armenian word from the Proto-Indo-European root *ḱeh₃ro-, meaning "sharp");
tarma-ǰur "spring water" from Hurrian tarman(l)i "spring" (an alternate etymology suggests that at least ǰur has an Armenian etymology from Proto-Indo-European *yuHr- or gʷʰdyōro-);
ułt "camel" from Hurrian uḷtu "camel";
xarxarel "to destroy" from Urartian harhar-š- "to destroy";
xnjor "apple" from Hurrian ḫinzuri "apple" (itself from Akkadian hašhūru, šahšūru).
Arnaud Fournet, Hrach Martirosyan, and Armen Petrosyan propose additional borrowed words of Armenian origin loaned into Urartian and vice versa, including grammatical words and parts of speech, such as Urartian "eue" ("and"), attested in the earliest Urartian texts and likely a loan from Armenian (compare to Armenian "yev" (և, եվ), ultimately from Proto-Indo-European *h₁epi). Other loans from Armenian into Urartian includes personal names, toponyms, and names of deities.

See also 

Urartu
Hurrians
Hurrian language
Proto-Armenian

References

Literature 
C. B. F. Walker: Reading the Past: Cuneiform. British Museum Press, 1996, .
J. Friedrich: "Urartäisch", in Handbuch der Orientalistik I, ii, 1-2, pp. 31–53. Leiden, 1969.
Gernot Wilhelm: "Urartian", in R. Woodard (ed.), The Cambridge Encyclopedia of the World’s Ancient Languages. Cambridge, 2004.
Vyacheslav V. Ivanov: "Comparative Notes on Hurro-Urartian, Northern Caucasian and Indo-European". UCLA, 1996
Mirjo Salvini: Geschichte und Kultur der Urartäer. Wissenschaftliche Buchgesellschaft, Darmstadt, 1995.
Jeffrey J. Klein, "Urartian Hieroglyphic Inscriptions from Altintepe", Anatolian Studies, Vol. 24, (1974),  77-94.

External links

 Electronic Corpus of Urartian texts with English translations and general informations on Urartu and the Urartian written sources created by B. Christiansen on the basis of M. Salvini's Corpus dei testi urartei I–V
 Russian-language scholarly publications on Urartu and the Urartian language; includes texts in Urartian
 A Urartian glossary (based on Die Urartäische Sprache:  (1971) by G.A. Melikishvili

Hurro-Urartian languages
Urartu
Languages attested from the 9th century BC
Languages extinct in the 6th century BC